Virgil Youngquist "Joe" Lindahl (March 14, 1919 – January 11, 2008) was an American football player and coach and college athletics administrator. He served as the head football coach at Colorado State College—now known as University of Northern Colorado—in Greeley, Colorado from 1954 to 1962, compiling a record of 35–44–4.

Lindahl was born on March 14, 1919, in Tilden, Nebraska, to August and Ellen (Youngquist) Lindahl. He attended Tilden High School and the played college football and college basketball at Wayne State College in Wayne, Nebraska. Lindahl served in the United States Army Air Forces from 1941 to 1944. He earned a Master of Arts degree from Colorado State College in 1949 and a doctorate from Indiana University Bloomington in 1964. Lindahl died on January 11, 2008, in Sun City, Arizona.

Head coaching record

College

References

External links
 
 

1919 births
2008 deaths
American football ends
American football guards
New York Giants players
Northern Colorado Bears athletic directors
Northern Colorado Bears football coaches
Wayne State Wildcats football players
Wayne State Wildcats men's basketball players
High school football coaches in Nebraska
United States Army Air Forces personnel of World War II
Indiana University Bloomington alumni
University of Northern Colorado alumni
People from Tilden, Nebraska
Coaches of American football from Nebraska
Players of American football from Nebraska
Basketball players from Nebraska